Ocotea viridiflora is a species of plant, an evergreen tree in the genus Ocotea of the family Lauraceae. It is found in Panama and possibly Costa Rica.

References

viridiflora
Flora of Panama
Flora of Costa Rica
Trees of Central America
Taxonomy articles created by Polbot